The Independence Lakes are a chain of four alpine glacial lakes in Cassia County, Idaho, United States, located in the Albion Mountains in Sawtooth National Forest. The lakes are located in the basin north of Cache Peak and east of Mount Independence in the upper portion of the Green Creek watershed. The lakes have not been individually named, and trail 805 leads to the lakes. The closest trailhead is the Independence Lakes trailhead at the end of forest road 728.

References

Lakes of Idaho
Lakes of Cassia County, Idaho
Glacial lakes of the United States
Glacial lakes of the Sawtooth National Forest